Galabinov Spur (‘Galabinov Rid’ \g&-l&-'bi-nov 'rid\ is the narrow rocky ridge descending from elevation 1700 m to 975 m and projecting from Detroit Plateau 1.7 km west-northwestwards into upper Cayley Glacier on Danco Coast in Graham Land, Antarctica.

The ridge is named after Chavdar Galabinov, construction engineer at St. Kliment Ohridski base in 2005/06 and subsequent seasons.

Location
British mapping in 1978.

Maps
British Antarctic Territory. Scale 1:200000 topographic map. DOS 610 Series, Sheet W 64 60. Directorate of Overseas Surveys, Tolworth, UK, 1978.
 Antarctic Digital Database (ADD). Scale 1:250000 topographic map of Antarctica. Scientific Committee on Antarctic Research (SCAR). Since 1993, regularly upgraded and updated.

Notes

References
 Bulgarian Antarctic Gazetteer. Antarctic Place-names Commission. (details in Bulgarian, basic data in English)
Galabinov Spur. SCAR Composite Gazetteer of Antarctica

External links
 Galabinov Spur. Adjusted Copernix satellite image

Ridges of Graham Land
Bulgaria and the Antarctic
Danco Coast